East Arrowwood Creek is a stream in Alberta, Canada.

East Arrowwood Creek takes its name from the Blackfoot term, nehis-ziks-kway, which means "arrowwood place".

See also
List of rivers of Alberta

References

Rivers of Alberta